Danny Flaherty (19 March 1873 – 10 October 1901) was an Australian rules footballer who played with Collingwood in the VFA and Victorian Football League (VFL).

Family	
The youngest son of Hugh James Flaherty (-1893), and Bridget Flaherty, née Toohey, Hugh James Flaherty was born at Sandridge, Victoria (now known as Port Melbourne) on 19 March 1873.

Death
He died (suddenly) of pneumonia at the Melbourne Hospital on 10 October 1901.

Notes

References
 Holmesby, Russell & Main, Jim (2014), The Encyclopedia of AFL Footballers: Every AFL/VFL player since 1897 (10th ed.), Seaford, Victoria: BAS Publishing.

External links 
 		
 
 Danny Flaherty's profile at Collingwood Forever

1873 births
1901 deaths
Australian rules footballers from Victoria (Australia)
Port Melbourne Football Club players
Collingwood Football Club players
Deaths from pneumonia in Australia